Stuart McKenzie (born 27 March 1961) is a former Australian rules footballer who played with Melbourne in the Victorian Football League (VFL).

Notes

External links 		
		
		
		
		
		
		
1961 births
Living people
Australian rules footballers from Victoria (Australia)		
Melbourne Football Club players
Kyabram Football Club players